The Francesco St Jerome is an oil painting on copper attributed to the circle of the Italian Renaissance artist Palma the Younger, dating from c. 1595. 
 
The painting was believed to possibly be the lost original work by Palma when it was rediscovered in January 2008 and became known to the public upon its featuring in a number of newspapers in the United Kingdom and around the world.

Named after Palma's patron, Francesco Maria II della Rovere, Duke of Urbino. The Duke is believed to have commissioned the original composition and the Francesco St Jerome is the finest surviving example of the now believed lost masterpiece.

After its discovery, the painting was loaned for two years to The Courtauld Gallery as a teaching aid to students. Offering for academic study a rare surviving example of copper painting from the period, This included extensive research and restoration in an attempt to ascertain its authorship.

The painting dates from the height of Palma's fame and artistic ability and was most likely created by one of his students or a pupil in the workshop of Hendrik Goltioz, who famously produced an engraving of the composition. One of the most outstanding aspects of the painting is its fine detail and vividly bright colours: paintings on copper often retain their brightness and condition better than those on canvas. The painting is currently part of The Albertyne Collections on loan to History Portal, a not for profit community, arts, history, and cultural focus organisation.

External links
Official History Portal Website
https://assets.courtauld.ac.uk/wp-content/uploads/2015/11/31141757/2013-Saint-Jerome-after-Jacopo-Palma.pdf The paintings conservation and art historical analysis report compiled by the Courtauld Institute of Art

1590s paintings
Paintings of Jerome
Books in art
Paintings of crucifixes
Lions in art
Skulls in art